Hyphessobrycon albolineatum is a South American species of tetra in the family Characidae.

References

External links
 Fishbase

Characidae
Taxa named by Augustín Fernández-Yépez
Fish described in 1950